Stanley Thatcher Blake (1910 – 24 February 1973) was an Australian botanist who served as president of the Royal Society of Queensland and who was associated with the Queensland Herbarium beginning in 1945 until his death.

Background 
Prior to his stint with the Herbarium, Blake received a Walter and Eliza Hall Fellowship which allowed him to undertake botanical collecting expeditions to Western Queensland (1935–1937).

Blake is also credited with validating the name Melaleuca quinquenervia, which was initially proposed by Antonio José Cavanilles (1745–1804).

References

Bright Sparks. Blake, Stanley Thatcher (1911–1973)

1910 births
1973 deaths
20th-century Australian botanists
Royal Society of Queensland
Australian Botanical Liaison Officers